Bill Brandt (born Hermann Wilhelm Brandt; 2 May 1904 – 20 December 1983) was a British photographer and photojournalist. Born in Germany, Brandt moved to England, where he became known for his images of British society for such magazines as Lilliput and Picture Post; later he made distorted nudes, portraits of famous artists and landscapes. He is widely considered to be one of the most important British photographers of the 20th century.

Life and work

Born in Hamburg, Germany, son of a British father and German mother, Brandt grew up during World War I, during which his father, who had lived in Germany since the age of five, was interned for six months by the Germans as a British citizen. Brandt later disowned his German heritage and would claim he was born in South London. Shortly after the war, he contracted tuberculosis and spent much of his youth in a sanatorium in Davos, Switzerland.  He traveled to Vienna to undertake a course of treatment by psychoanalysis. He was, in any case, pronounced cured and was taken under the wing of socialite Eugenie Schwarzwald. When Ezra Pound visited the Schwarzwald residence, Brandt made his portrait. In appreciation, Pound reportedly offered Brandt an introduction to Man Ray, whose Paris studio and darkroom Brandt would access in 1930.

In 1933 Brandt moved to London and began documenting all levels of British society. This kind of documentary was uncommon at that time.  Brandt published two books showcasing this work, The English at Home (1936) and A Night in London (1938).  He was a regular contributor to magazines such as  Lilliput, Picture Post, and Harper's Bazaar. He documented the Underground bomb shelters of London during The Blitz in 1940, commissioned by the Ministry of Information.

During World War II Brandt concentrated on many subjects – as can be seen in his Camera in London (1948) but excelled in portraiture and landscape. To mark the arrival of peace in 1945 he began a celebrated series of nudes. His major books from the post-war period are Literary Britain (1951), and Perspective of Nudes (1961), followed by a compilation of his best work, Shadow of Light (1966). Brandt became Britain's most influential and internationally admired photographer of the 20th century. Many of his works have important social commentary but also poetic resonance. His landscapes and nudes are dynamic, intense and powerful, often using wide-angle lenses and distortion.

Brandt died in London in 1983.

Recognition
In 1984, Bill Brandt was posthumously inducted into the International Photography Hall of Fame and Museum.

In 2010, an English Heritage blue plaque for Brandt was erected in London at 4 Airlie Gardens, Kensington, W8.

Exhibitions
1969: Bill Brandt, 1969, Museum of Modern Art, New York. Curated by John Szarkowski 
1985: Bill Brandt: Behind the Camera, 1985, Philadelphia Museum of Art
2004: Bill Brandt: A Centenary Retrospective, 2004, Victoria & Albert Museum, London. "A selection of rare and famous prints from the Brandt archive".
2013: Shadow and Light, Museum of Modern Art, New York. Curated by Sarah Hermanson Meister.
2013: Bill Brandt, Early Prints from the Collection of the Family Edwynn Houk Gallery, New York. "A selection of rare and famous prints from the Brandt archive".
2017: Bill Brandt, Works from the 1940's and Harper's Bazaar, William Holman Gallery, 2017.
2018: Bill Brandt Vintage Works, 2018/19, Michael Hoppen Gallery
2021: Bill Brandt, Kunstfoyer (Versicherungskammer Kulturstiftung), Munich, 27 September – 28 November 2021.
2022: Bill Brandt: Inside the Mirror, 2022, Tate Britain, London. Curated by Carol Jacobi

Publications
Hopkinson, Tom. Poetry: Bill Brandt – Photographer. Lilliput 11(2):130-41
Warburton, Nigel (ed.). Bill Brandt; Selected texts and bibliography. Oxford: Clio, 1993; Macmillan Library Reference, 1994.
Wells, Liz (ed.). Photography, A Critical Introduction. Routledge, 1997.
Time Life Books Editors. The Print Time Life International, 1972.
Read, John. Portrait of an Artist: Henry Moore. London, 1979.
Mellor, David. Bill Brandt: Behind the Camera Photographs 1923–1983. New York: Aperture, 1985.
Kelly, Jain (ed.). Nude:Theory. Lustrum, 1979.
Kee, Robert. The Picture Post Album. London, 1993.
Jeffrey, Ian. Photography: Concise History. Thames and Hudson, World of Art Series, 1981; reprinted 1989
Jay, Bill. Occam's Razor: Outside-in Viewing Contemporary Photography. Germany: Nazraeli, 1994.
Iverson, Margaret (ed.). Psychoanalysis. Art History 17(3), 1994.
Haworth-Booth, Mark. Contemporary British Photography: Into the 1990s. Aperture, 1989.
Goldberg, Vicki. Photography in Print; Writings from 1816 to the Present. Albuquerque: University of New Mexico Press, 1981.
Burgin, Victor (ed.). Thinking Photography. Macmillan, 1982.
Brandt, Bill. Shadow and Light. Sarah Hermanson Meister. New York: Museum of Modern Art, 2013..
Brandt, Bill. Brandt: Nudes. London: Thames and Hudson, 2012.
Brandt, Bill. Brandt: The Photographs of Bill Brandt. London: Thames and Hudson, 1999.
Brandt, Bill. Bill Brandt. Milan: Gruppo Editoriale Fabbri, 1982.
Brandt, Bill. Bill Brandt: Photographs 1928–1983. London: Thames and Hudson, 1993.
Brandt, Bill. Bill Brandt. London: Marlborough Fine Art, 1976.
Brandt, Bill. Nudes: Bill Brandt. Bulfinch, 1980.
Brandt, Bill. Portraits: Photographs by Bill Brandt. London: G. Fraser, 1982; Austin: University of Texas Press, 1982.
Brandt, Bill. London in the Thirties. London: G. Fraser, 1983; New York: Pantheon, 1983..
Brandt, Bill. Bill Brandt: Nudes 1945–1980 The Gordon Fraser, London and Bedford 1980 Boston: New York Graphic Society, 1980.
Brandt, Bill. Shadow of Light. London: Bodley Head, 1966; New York: Viking, 1966; New York: Da Capo, 1977; London: Gordon Fraser, 1977.
Brandt, Bill. Bill Brandt: Early Photographs, 1930–1942. London: Arts Council of Great Britain, 1975.
Brandt, Bill. Ombres d'une Ile. Paris: Le Belier Prisma, 1966.
Brandt, Bill. Perspectives sur le Nu. Paris: Prisma, 1961.
Brandt, Bill. Bill Brandt: Perspective of Nudes. London: The Bodley Head, 1961; New York: Amphoto, 1961.
Brandt, Bill. Literary Britain. London: Cassell and Company, 1951. With an introduction by John Hayward.
Brandt, Bill. The English at Home. New York: C. Scribner's; London: B. T. Batsford, 1936. With an introduction by Raymond Mortimer.
Brandt, Bill. Camera in London. London: Focal, 1948.
Delany, Paul: Bill Brandt: A Life. Stanford University Press, 2004

References

General references
V&A Working methods, accessed, 30 March 2010

External links
    
 The Bill Brandt Archive – biography and images.
Bill Brandt at the Art Institute of Chicago
 Bill Brandt at Artcyclopedia – list of image galleries and museum exhibits.
 Exploring 20th century London – Bill Brandt Photographs by Bill Brandt in the Museum of London collection
 Bill Brandt images in the English Heritage Archive- 449 war time photographs by Bill Brandt.  
 Bill Brandt video
 Brandt at Victoria and Albert Museum, London

1904 births
1983 deaths
British photojournalists
Photographers from London
British erotic photographers
War photographers
Landscape photographers
Emigrants from Nazi Germany to the United Kingdom